The 1977–78 Idaho Vandals men's basketball team represented the University of Idaho during the 1977–78 NCAA Division I basketball season. Members of the Big Sky Conference, the Vandals were led by fourth-year head coach Jim Jarvis and played their home games on campus at the Kibbie Dome in Moscow, Idaho. They were 4–22 overall and 1–13 in conference play.

No Vandals were named to the all-conference team; sophomore forward Reed Jaussi was honorable mention.

After four seasons with last place finishes in the conference, Jarvis resigned in June 1978 under recurring allegations of illegal recruiting. The program had been placed on probation for one year in January, resulting in a reprimand for Jarvis and assistant coach Wes Sodorff by the university.

Jarvis was succeeded in August by alumnus Don Monson, an assistant at Michigan State, who had significantly greater success; he led the Vandals to a conference title in 1981 and the NCAA Sweet Sixteen in 1982.

References

External links
Sports Reference – Idaho Vandals: 1977–78 basketball season
Gem of the Mountains: 1978 University of Idaho yearbook – 1977–78 basketball season
Idaho Argonaut – student newspaper – 1978 editions

Idaho Vandals men's basketball seasons
Idaho
Idaho
Idaho